The 2007 Women's County One-Day Championship was the 11th cricket Women's County Championship season. It ran from May to August and saw 30 county teams and teams representing Scotland and Wales compete in a series of divisions. Kent Women won the County Championship as winners of the top division, achieving their second title in two seasons.

Competition format 
Teams played matches within a series of divisions with the winners of the top division being crowned County Champions. Matches were played using a one day format with 50 overs per side.

The championship works on a points system with positions within the divisions being based on the total points. Points were awarded as follows:

Win: 25 points. 
Tie:  15 points. 
Loss: Bonus points.
No Result: 4 points.
Abandoned: 10 points.

Up to four batting and four bowling points were available to the losing side only, or both sides in an incomplete match.

Teams
The 2007 Championship was divided into two tiers: the County Championship and the County Challenge Cup. The County Championship consisted of three divisions of four teams, whilst the Challenge Cup consisted of five groups of four teams, with Division A as the top tier and Groups 1 to 4 as equal tiers below. The winner of Division A of the Challenge Cup were promoted to the County Championship.

Teams in the County Championship and Division A of the Challenge Cup played each other twice, whilst teams in Groups 1 to 4 of the Challenge Cup played each other once.

County Championship

County Challenge Cup

County Championship

Division One 

Source: Cricket Archive

Division Two 

Source: Cricket Archive

Division Three 

Source: Cricket Archive

County Challenge Cup

Division A 

Source: Cricket Archive

Group 1 

Source: Cricket Archive

Group 2 

Source: Cricket Archive

Group 3 

Source: Cricket Archive

Group 4 

Source: Cricket Archive

Statistics

Most runs

Source: CricketArchive

Most wickets

Source: CricketArchive

Notes

References

2007
cricket
cricket